Mocis mayeri is a species of moth in the family Erebidae first described by Jean Baptiste Boisduval in 1833. It has a wide range in Africa, which includes Cameroon, Cape Verde, the Comoros, the Democratic Republic of the Congo, Eritrea, Ghana, Kenya, Réunion, Madagascar, Malawi, Mauritius, Mozambique, Nigeria, Senegal, the Seychelles, Sierra Leone, South Africa, Sudan, Tanzania, the Gambia, Uganda, Zambia and Zimbabwe. It is also found in Saudi Arabia and Yemen.

Etymology
Boisduval dedicated this species to Mr. Gustave Mayer from Mauritius.

References

Moths described in 1833
Moths of Africa
Moths of Cape Verde
Moths of the Comoros
Moths of Madagascar
Moths of Mauritius
Moths of Réunion
Moths of Seychelles
Moths of the Middle East
mayeri